The Aiken Thoroughbred Racing Hall of Fame and Museum was established in 1977 as a tribute to the famous flat racing and steeplechase Thoroughbred horses that trained in Aiken, South Carolina.

The museum was a project of the local Jaycees, aided by Thoroughbred horse racing expert Whitney Tower, horse racing editor for Sports Illustrated and Vice President of the National Racing Museum and Chair of its Hall of Fame.

The museum is located on the grounds of Hopelands Gardens, the former home of Charles Oliver Iselin and Hope Goddard Iselin that is now owned by the City of Aiken. The museum occupies the Iselins' former carriage house and stables. The Hall of Fame commemorates 40 Eclipse Award-winning horses that trained in Aiken; the museum also includes a variety of other exhibits.

Inductees

 Assagai
 Barnaby's Bluff
 Blue Peter
 Bowl Game
 Candy Éclair
 Capot
 Christmas Past
 Conniver
 Conquistador Cielo
 De La Rose
 Demonstrative
 Devil Diver
 Elkridge
 Forty Niner
 Gallorette
 Gamely
 Hawaii
 Heavenly Cause
 Kelso
 Lamb Chop
 Late Bloomer
 Midshipman
 Neji
 Oedipus
 Open Fire
 Pleasant Colony
 Pleasant Stage
 Pleasant Tap
 Politely
 Quick Pitch
 Relaxing
 Sensational
 Shuvee
 Smart Angle
 Snow Knight
 Stage Door Johnny
 Storm Song
 Swale
 Tea Maker
 Tom Fool

See also
U.S. Thoroughbred Racing Hall of Fame

References

External links
OfficialSite
Gallery: Thoroughbred Museum", Aiken Standard, March 12, 2015 Dead link

Horse racing organizations in the United States
Horse racing museums and halls of fame
Equestrian museums in the United States
Sports museums in South Carolina
Halls of fame in South Carolina
Museums in Aiken County, South Carolina
Museums established in 1977
Buildings and structures in Aiken, South Carolina
Awards established in 1977
1977 establishments in South Carolina